Margrit Olfert, née Herbst (born 10 February 1947 in Magdeburg) is a retired East German athlete who specialized in the long jump and pentathlete.

She competed for the sports club SC Magdeburg during her active career.

Achievements

1947 births
Living people
East German female long jumpers
East German pentathletes
Athletes (track and field) at the 1972 Summer Olympics
Olympic athletes of East Germany
Sportspeople from Magdeburg
European Athletics Championships medalists
Universiade medalists in athletics (track and field)
Universiade gold medalists for East Germany
Medalists at the 1973 Summer Universiade
People from Bezirk Magdeburg